Rice porridge may refer to:

 Champorado, a sweet chocolate rice porridge in Philippine cuisine
 Rice congee
 Rice pudding
 Lâpa (Turkish) or lapas (Greek), a rice porridge in the Balkans, Levant, and Middle East